The Y-League is a semi-professional association football league in Australia. It is currently consists of ten teams. The league has been contested since 2008. In its most recent form, the league includes a 10-round regular season and an end-of-season grand final playoff tournament involving the highest-placed team, culminating in the Grand Final match. The winner of the Y-League Grand Final is crowned champions, where as the regular season winners is dubbed premiers.

List of seasons
The following is a list of all Y-League seasons. It contains the number of teams, the number of matches played, the champions and the top scorer(s) in regular season matches—winner of the Golden Boot.

Grand Finals
The A-League Grand Final is the final match of the A-League season, the culmination of the finals series, determining the Champion of the tournament.

See also
Y-League records and statistics

References